The year 2010 is the 18th year in the history of Pancrase, a mixed martial arts promotion based in Japan. In 2010 Pancrase held 16 events beginning with Pancrase: Gate 4th Chance.

Title fights

Events list

Pancrase: Gate 4th Chance

Pancrase: Gate 4th Chance was an event held on January 10, 2010 at The Gold's Gym South Tokyo Annex in Tokyo, Japan.

Results

Pancrase: Passion Tour 1

Pancrase: Passion Tour 1 was an event held on February 7, 2010 at The Differ Ariake Arena in Tokyo, Japan.

Results

Pancrase: Passion Tour 2

Pancrase: Passion Tour 2 was an event held on March 22, 2010 at The Azelea Taisho Hall in Osaka, Osaka, Japan.

Results

Pancrase: Passion Tour 3

Pancrase: Passion Tour 3 was an event held on April 4, 2010 at The Differ Ariake Arena in Tokyo, Japan.

Results

Pancrase: Passion Tour 4

Pancrase: Passion Tour 4 was an event held on April 29, 2010 at The Differ Ariake Arena in Tokyo, Japan.

Results

Pancrase: Gate 5th Chance

Pancrase: Gate 5th Chance was an event held on May 16, 2010 at The Gold's Gym South Tokyo Annex in Tokyo, Japan.

Results

Pancrase: Passion Tour 5

Pancrase: Passion Tour 5 was an event held on June 5, 2010 at The Differ Ariake Arena in Tokyo, Japan.

Results

Pancrase: Passion Tour 6

Pancrase: Passion Tour 6 was an event held on July 4, 2010 at The Differ Ariake Arena in Tokyo, Japan.

Results

Pancrase: Passion Tour 7

Pancrase: Passion Tour 7 was an event held on August 8, 2010 at The Differ Ariake Arena in Tokyo, Japan.

Results

Pancrase: Passion Tour 8

Pancrase: Passion Tour 8 was an event held on September 5, 2010 at The Differ Ariake Arena in Tokyo, Japan.

Results

Pancrase: 2010 Pro-Am Open Catch Wrestling Tournament

Pancrase: 2010 Pro-Am Open Catch Wrestling Tournament was an event held on September 19, 2010 at The Gold's Gym South Tokyo Annex in Tokyo, Japan.

Results

Pancrase: Gate 6th Chance

Pancrase: Gate 6th Chance was an event held on September 19, 2010 at The Gold's Gym South Tokyo Annex in Tokyo, Japan.

Results

Pancrase: Passion Tour 9

Pancrase: Passion Tour 9 was an event held on October 3, 2010 at The Differ Ariake Arena in Tokyo, Japan.

Results

Pancrase: Passion Tour 10

Pancrase: Passion Tour 10 was an event held on November 3, 2010 at The Differ Ariake Arena in Tokyo, Japan.

Results

Pancrase: Passion Tour 11

Pancrase: Passion Tour 11 was an event held on December 5, 2010 at The Differ Ariake Arena in Tokyo, Japan.

Results

Pancrase: Passion Tour 12

Pancrase: Passion Tour 12 was an event held on December 19, 2010 at Azelea Taisho Hall in Osaka, Osaka, Japan.

Results

See also 
 Pancrase
 List of Pancrase champions
 List of Pancrase events

References

Pancrase events
2010 in mixed martial arts